Kiara Parker (born October 28, 1996) is an American track and field athlete who specializes in sprint. She represented the United States at the 2019 World Athletics Championships, winning a bronze medal in 4 × 100 metres relay.

After an undefeated senior season at Westlake High School in Waldorf, Maryland, Parker enrolled at the University of Arkansas. Competing in the indoor and outdoor sprints, Kiara was an eight time All-American for the Razorbacks. As of 2019, she is the school record holder in both the 100m meters (11.02) and 60 meters (7.15). 

She is sponsored by Asics.

References

External links

American female sprinters
1996 births
Living people
World Athletics Championships athletes for the United States
World Athletics Championships medalists
Arkansas Razorbacks women's track and field athletes